Vriesea melgueroi is a plant species in genus Vriesea. This species is endemic to Venezuela.

References

melgueroi
Flora of Venezuela